G-Force is a 1980 studio album by the namesake Irish-American band led by Irish rock guitarist Gary Moore.

While touring America with Thin Lizzy in support of the band's album Black Rose: A Rock Legend, Moore suddenly quit the band and moved to Los Angeles, hoping to establish a solo rock presence. With the opportunity to tour America in support of Van Halen, Moore recruited his one-time Thin Lizzy bandmate, drummer Mark Nauseef (Elf, the Ian Gillan Band), and vocalist/bassist Glenn Hughes (Trapeze, Deep Purple), dubbing the band "G-Force". Several months into rehearsals, Hughes left the band after an alcohol-fuelled altercation with Moore and was replaced with vocalist Willie Dee (born William Daffern; formerly of Captain Beyond and Pipedream) and Motown session bassist Tony Newton (former member of The Tony Williams New Lifetime). The subsequent tour was a success, and the band went on to support Whitesnake on their 1980 Ready an' Willing tour. However, the project was short-lived, only producing the one eponymous album, which was re-mixed by Dennis Mackay. The album consisted of more conventional hard rock radio-oriented music than Moore's previous efforts. The band also recorded the Newton and Dee-penned song "Trust Your Lovin'", only released as a B-side to the 7" single "You".

Soon after the album was released, G-Force disbanded and Moore joined Greg Lake of Emerson, Lake & Palmer fame on a new venture, a collaboration that led to Lake's eponymous debut solo album.

Track listing

 — Separated into two tracks on some issues of the album

Personnel
G–Force
 Willie Dee – lead and backing vocals, bass, keyboards, Korg bass synthesizer, production
 Gary Moore – guitars, lead and backing vocals, keyboards and string arrangements (on tracks 4 and 8), production
 Tony Newton – bass, string arrangements (on track 6), production
 Mark Nauseef – drums, percussion, percussion synthesizer, production

Additional personnel
 Joachim Kuhn – additional keyboards
 Tom Scott – saxophone (on track 8), string arrangements (on track 4 and 6)
 Thee Ox – marimba

Technical personnel
 Mack, Mark Sackett and Tom La Tondre – engineers
 Dennis Mackay – remixing (on tracks 1-3, 5, 7 and 9)
 Moshe Brakha – photography

References

1980 debut albums
Gary Moore albums
Jet Records albums